Arkady Mikhaylovich Chernetsky (born May 8, 1950) is a Russian politician who has served as Mayor of Yekaterinburg, Sverdlovsk Oblast, Russia since January 1992 to November 2, 2010.

Early life
Arkady Mikhailovich Chernetsky was born on May 8, 1950, in Nizhny Tagil to an engineer (his father) and a surgeon (his mother).  In 1972, he graduated from the metallurgical department of the Ural Polytechnic Institute.

From 1972 to 1974 Chernetsky served as a tank platoon commander in the Soviet army.  He was stationed in the Turkmenia Military District.  He completed his term of service as a colonel.  After leaving the army, he began working at a factory where he remained for over ten years.

Chernetsky achieved a number of Soviet government awards.

Political career
In 1987, Chernetsky was elected as a deputy in the Sverdlovsk City Board of People's Deputies in 1987.  A year later, he became a member of the Sverdlovsk City Committee CPSU.  In January 1992, he was appointed the City Administration Chief.  From 1994 to 1995 he was a member of the Sverdlovsk regional government.  From 1995 to 1996 he was the chair of the Yekaterinburg municipal Duma.

Chernetsky is also the president of the Ural-Siberian UNESCO Center.

Other achievements
 Orders of Russian Orthodox Church: Order of Prince Daniel 3rd class and Order of St. Sergius of Radonezh 3rd class
 Russian Mayor of 1995
 Honored Industrial Engineer of the Russian Federation (awarded in 1997)
 Honored Citizen of Yekaterinburg (awarded in August 1999)
 Order of Honour (awarded in 2000)
 Order of Friendship (2015)
 Honored Citizen of Sverdlovsk Oblast (2020)
 Order of Alexander Nevsky (2021)

References

External links
 Yekaterinburg Website (English version)

Mayors of Yekaterinburg
Members of the Federation Council of Russia (after 2000)
Living people
1950 births